Claudio Rivalta (born 30 June 1978) is a retired Italian football defender. He represented Italy at the 2000 Summer Olympics.

Career
In June 2004 Rivalta was signed by Atalanta B.C., with Valerio Foglio moving in the opposite direction.

In October 2008, Rivalta extended his contract with Atalanta, keeping him at the club until June 2011.

In January 2009, Rivalta was sold to Torino and signed a three-year contract worth €800,000.

References

External links
 Atalanta B.C. Official Player Profile
 Claudio Rivalta National Team Stats at FIGC.it

1978 births
Living people
Sportspeople from Ravenna
Association football defenders
Italian footballers
Italy youth international footballers
Italy under-21 international footballers
Olympic footballers of Italy
Footballers at the 2000 Summer Olympics
Serie A players
Serie B players
Serie C players
A.C. Cesena players
Atalanta B.C. players
A.C. Perugia Calcio players
L.R. Vicenza players
Torino F.C. players
Spezia Calcio players
Footballers from Emilia-Romagna